Evan Clifford Symons Green (21 May 1930 – 16 March 1996) was an Australian motoring publicist, journalist, TV commentator and novelist. He was also a rally driver with international recognition. He wrote many articles about himself and his experiences while rally driving.

Early life
His first novel, Alice to Nowhere, was produced by Brendon Lumney into a two-part television mini-series in 1986 directed by John Power. The film starred John Waters as Johnny Parson, Steve Jacobs as Dave Mitchell and Rosey Jones as Barbara Dean.

Motor racing
As a leading motoring journalist and being very well spoken, Green was a television commentator and interviewer for the Seven Network and was well known for his commentary at the Bathurst 1000 motor race from the 1960s until his last Bathurst race as commentator in 1983. Green would continue doing motor racing commentary both in Australia and New Zealand until 1987.

Evan Green was also a rally driver of international fame, competing in such events as the Round Australia Trial and the London-Sydney Marathon.

Supercar scare
In 1972 Evan Green was incorrectly and unfairly credited by the motoring public as being responsible for the public and media controversy, known colloquially as the Australian 'SuperCar scare', which ended the life of the Ford XA Falcon GT-HO Phase IV, the experimental Holden LJ Torana GTR XU-1 V8, and the Valiant VH Chargers extremely high powered six cylinder engine - with the racing Chrysler V8 engined Charger , all ready under development but planned for the later 1973 Australian race season.Evan Green released a newspaper article that was headlined "160mph SuperCars soon". and it made it to the front page on the Sydney Morning Herald in the state of NSW alone - on 25 June 1972 – and that article was released within the final week of the very end of all the "SuperCars" - as the various car companies and the governing race car bodies all made official announcements of the end of the "Super-Car" race format and their respective race car development programs by 2 July 1972.

Actual public and government concerns over "Super-Fast" and "Super-Cars" has been present in the mainstream Australian newspapers papers since before the 1967 Falcon GT was publicly released and the concerns are noted by Clyde Hodgins in a 26 March 1967 article for the Sydney Morning Herald , proclaiming a 115mph Falcon was coming and concerns were accelerated even further when the AGE newspaper ran a story covering the "soon to be released" , 120mph GT Falcon – on 15 April 1967. These are only two of a large range of articles that cover the publics concerns over the high performance ‘Super-Fast’ or ‘Super-Cars" that would appear in the Australian mainstream papers alongside headlines that also proclaimed the publics concern over the excessively high - road death toll that Australia also had at the time. On 24 July 1969 - the same day that the Ford GTHO Phase 1 "Super-Car" was publicly announced in the mainstream papers – The N.S.W. Transport  Minister is quoted as opening the annual conference of the Motor Trades – and then taking the Motor trade to task – for its "irresponsible promotion of speed". Threats from the government minister and the state premier were publicly recorded in the mainstream papers as threatening the car manufactures that they may be excluded from eligibility of any government contacts if the manufacturers continued to make and sell to the public any car considered a ‘SuperCar’ or as another consideration , any car capable of going faster then 130mph could ultimately require a special drivers license to drive it – and that was 1969.

For 5 November 1970, the AGE newspaper, reported on a government appointed committee to probe the nationally recorded 3383 deaths on Australian roads in 1969. By 1970 , the road toll was to be the highest amount of deaths on Australian roads ever seen, with The Age newspaper on 6 October 1970 reporting the NSW road toll alone was 977 deaths in only the state of NSW and the year was yet unfinished. 

.

As 1972 arrived and the car companies either announced or hinted at their latest and fastest - coming ‘SuperCars’ – unrelated to Evan Greens story, but already heavily under pressure from governments and authorities alike - the governing body of motor sport in Australia – the Confederation of Australian Motorsport – would on the Thursday 20 June 1972 , buckle under pressure and announce with minimal ceremony - the actual deletion of the ‘Series-Production’ car races that had given birth to the Australian SuperCars. Giving all the so called "Showroom Race Cars – or Super Cars" – literally no race category to run in, anywhere in Australia. Multiple papers quietly reported on the CAMS announcement and papers like the Canberra Times , on the next day (30 June 1972) would publicly report on the CAMS decision and the actually deletion of the race category that the "SuperCars" had once so successfully raced in. Knowing that there was no official category for their production ‘SuperCars’ to race in anymore – General Motors Holden’s , also on the same Friday 30 July 1972 – publicly announced in the mainstream papers that they had cancelled all their plans to produce and release their new semi secret 145 mph V8 Torana ‘SuperCar’ , codenamed the XV-1 , that was destined for the 1972 Bathurst race. Again this was announced and printed in multiple mainstream newspapers on 30 June , The AGE newspaper carrying one of the many articles mentioning this landmark GM-H decision.

As it was right on the weekend, Ford and Chrysler held weekend crisis meetings on  Saturday 1 June 1972 and for Ford , also into the Sunday 2 June 1972 – with eventually both Chrysler and Ford on the Monday 3 July 1972 also publicly announcing their immediate abandonment of their ‘Showroom-SuperCar’ programs , as like their competitor, GM-H -  the cars no longer had a race category to compete in, after the CAMS decision to delete the race category. Entertainingly , although Chrysler Australia in their press release announcing the end to their ‘SuperCar’ program – would say they had been developing a V8 Charger – soon after that Chryslers executives and their test driver, leading racer Leo Geoghegan, would deny that the Charger was ever to be fitted with a high performance V8 (which was true for the 1972 Bathurst at least). Although, in subsequent years it was revealed that Chrysler Australia did experiment with a 340ci-powered VG Valiant coupe that "went like Hell" according to the Geoghegan brothers. A 'test mule' was fitted with both the V8 and the Hemi-6 and was tested at the Mallala raceway in South Australia, with the 6cyl proving significantly faster in the shorter track due to less weight at the front of the car).[1]

.

As a direct result of the apparent sudden end to all SuperCar production for the start of July in 1972 , yet only a bare week after the lone article by Even Green was printed as a headline in a single paper – and despite that fact that the problem and concerns over such cars had been well recorded in multiple mainstream papers, by different journalists as far back as 1967. The ‘blame’ for the death of the Australian SuperCars would be unfairly focused solely on Evan Green and the article he wrote – and as a result , over the years to come he was often shunned or given short answers when he tried to do grid or pit interviews with Australian motor racing legends Harry Firth (Holden) and Allan Moffat (Ford), both of whom had been involved in the development of cars that had been killed off. For his part, Harry Firth's Holden Dealer Team had completed virtually all the testing and development of the V8 Torana (both on and off the race track), and years later said in an interview with Australian Muscle Car magazine that "Evan Green was no friend of mine".

Despite his perceived but incorrect role in starting (or ending if you like) - the Australian SuperCar scare, Evan Green would drive and road test many cars and would even write a favorable road test on the Phase 3 GTHO Falcon ‘SuperCar’ amongst many other cars and he would subsequently become a director at GM-Holden.[2]

Selected works
Journeys with Gelignite Jack (1967), Angus & Robertson. Also in a new edition Hit the Road, Jack (1991), Pan Macmillan. The story of a tough outback journey undertaken for the Castrol oil company, in which his life-long friend and fellow rally driver John "Gelignite Jack" Murray figures prominently.
Dust and Glory (1990), Macmillan. A novel whose action takes place in the fictitious 1956 Redex Trial (the last Redex Reliability Trial was in 1955). Several real-life characters appear, notably "Gelignite Jack", and Jack Davey, who in the book longs to be taken seriously as a rally driver rather than for his celebrity. Green himself is thinly disguised as journalist Harley "Norton" Alexander.

His other novels include: Adam's Empire, Kalinda, Bet Your life, On Borrowed Time, Clancy's Crossing and A Bootfull of Right Arms - covering his adventures during the 1974 London—Sahara—Munich World Cup Rally in an Australian Leyland P76 V8.

Family
Green's son Gavin served two stints as editor of the British motoring magazine Car.

References

Evan Green – AustLit
Evan Green – Selwa Anthony Author Management Agency

1930 births
1996 deaths
Australian rally drivers
Motorsport announcers
Motoring writers
Motoring journalists
20th-century Australian journalists
Racing drivers from New South Wales
Writers from New South Wales
20th-century Australian novelists
Australian male novelists
Driving in Australia